Saint Gregory the Illuminator Church may refer to:

Saint Gregory the Illuminator Cathedral, Antelias, seat of the Catholicossate of the Great House of Cilicia also known as Holy See of Cilicia
Saint Gregory the Illuminator Cathedral, Yerevan, the largest Armenian church in the world, in Yerevan, Armenia built in 2001
 Cathedral of Saint Elie and Saint Gregory the Illuminator, Armenian Catholic church in downtown Beirut, Lebanon built in 1940
Saint Gregory the Illuminator's Church, Baku, a non-functioning Armenian Apostolic church in Baku, Azerbaijan built in 1887
Ruins of Cathedral of St. Gregory the Illuminator in Zvartnots, Armenia built in the 7th century
Armenian Church, Singapore, an Armenian Apostolic church in Singapore, otherwise known as Church of Saint Gregory the Illuminator, built in 1835
 Saint Gregory the Illuminator Cathedral, Cairo,  an Armenian church in Cairo, Egypt built in 1928
 Saint Gregory the Illuminator Church, an Armenian Catholic church in Glendale, California built in 2001

Destroyed churches

Saint Gregory the Illuminator Church, Yerevan, was an Armenian Apostolic church in Yerevan, built in the 19th century and destroyed in 1939
 Saint Gregory the Illuminator Church, Tbilisi, was an Armenian Apostolic church in Tbilisi, destroyed in the 1930s

See also
St Gregory's Church (disambiguation)